Slovak Game of the Year Awards are annual awards that recognize accomplishments in video game development, first presented in 2017. It is presented as part of video game festival Fest Anča. It was launched as counterpart to Czech Game of the Year Awards.

2017 
Nominations were announced on 24 June 2018 for four categories. Vaporum and The House of Da Vinc received four nominations and Vikings: Wolves of Midgard received one nomination. Maguss was also nominated in one category. Vikings: Wolves of Midgard was best Slovak game of 2017. It aso received an award in category for Visual design.  has won awards in categories for the Best Debut Game and Best Game Design.

Slovak game of the year - Vikings: Wolves of Midgard by Games Farm
Nominated: Vaporum by Fatbot Games and The House of Da Vinci by Blue Brain Games
The Best Debut Game - Vaporum by Fatbot Games
Nominated: The House of Da Vinci by Blue Brain Games and Maguss by Mawa
Best Game Design - Vaporum by Fatbot Games and
Nominated: Vikings: Wolves of Midgard by Games Farm and The House of Da Vinci by Blue Brain Games
Best Visual Design - Vikings: Wolves of Midgard by Games Farm
Nominated: Vaporum by Fatbot Games and The House of Da Vinci by Blue Brain Games

2018
It was held on 31 May 2019. It was won by Shadows: Awakening.

Slovak game of the year - Shadows: Awakening by Games Farm
Best PC/Console Game - Shadows: Awakening by Games Farm
Best Mobile Game - Car Puzzler by Boris Zápotocký
Honorable Mention for Mobile Game - The Legend of Janosik by Black Deer Games
Player's Award - Shadows: Awakening by Games Farm
The Best Debut Game - Hellmut: The Badass from Hell by Volcanic
Honorable Mention for Game Debut - Loria by Erik Vinclav
Best Visual Design - Hellmut: The Badass from Hell by Volcanic
Honorable Mention for Visual Design - The Flood by Simple Ghost
Best Game Design - Hellmut: The Badass from Hell by Volcanic

2019
Nominations were announced on 13 March 2020. Nominated games include  BonVoyage!, Blood will be Spilled, AreaZ, The Fallen Kings, The House of Da Vinci 2, Hrdina, Merge Poker, Ski Legends, Splash Wars, Tile Towers, Trainstation 2 and Vivat Sloboda. Ceremony was scheduled for 30 April - 2 May 2020 but was delayed due to COVID-19 pandemic in Slovakia. Awards were held on 30 November 2020. Blood will be Spilled has won 4 awards including the main award.

Slovak game of the year - Blood will be Spilled by Doublequote Studio
Best PC/Console Game - Blood will be Spilled by Doublequote Studio
Best Mobile Game - Train Station 2: Rail Strategy by Pixel Federation
Sector.sk Award - Vivat Sloboda by Team Vivat
The Best Debut Game - Blood will be Spilled by Doublequote Studio
Best Visual Design - Blood will be Spilled by Doublequote Studio
Best Game Design - Train Station 2: Rail Strategy by Pixel Federation
Different view - Hrdina by Bartoš Studio

References

External links
Official website

Video gaming in Slovakia
Slovak awards
Awards established in 2018
Video game awards